Allan Junior Blaze (born 24 June 1994) is a Guadeloupean footballer who plays as a defender or midfielder.

Career
In 2012, Blaze signed for Italian Serie A side Genoa from the reserves of Nancy in the French Ligue 1.

In 2014, he signed for Italian third division club Mantova, where he made 23 league appearances and scored 0 goals.

In 2016, Blaze signed for Trino in the Italian fifth division from Italian fourth division team RapalloBogliasco.

In 2017, he signed for Rende in the Italian third division, where he made 83 league appearances and scored 0 goals.

In 2020, Blaze signed for Italian third division outfit Pro Vercelli after a trial.

On 13 January 2022, he signed with Serie C club Vibonese.

References

External links
 
 

1994 births
People from Petit-Bourg
Living people
Guadeloupean footballers
Association football defenders
Association football midfielders
Genoa C.F.C. players
F.C. Pro Vercelli 1892 players
Rende Calcio 1968 players
Mantova 1911 players
Championnat National 2 players
Serie C players
Serie D players
Eccellenza players
Guadeloupean expatriate footballers
Expatriate footballers in Italy
Guadeloupean expatriate sportspeople in Italy